Crémieux is a French surname. Notable people with the surname include:

 Adolphe Crémieux, French lawyer and statesman
 Fernand Crémieux (1857–1928), French lawyer and politician
 Hector-Jonathan Crémieux, French playwright and librettist
 Suzanne Crémieux (1895–1976), French politician
Crémieux, French fashion brand

French-language surnames